Ulmus glaucescens var. lasiocarpa Rehder, named the hairy-fruited glaucescent elm in the United States, is a Chinese tree found along rivers and mountain slopes at elevations of 2500–2600 m in the provinces of Hebei, Henan, Liaoning, Nei Mongol, Ningxia, eastern Qinghai, and Shanxi.

Description
The variety is distinguished by a "samara densely pubescent when young, with scattered hairs when mature. Fl. and fr. March–May.".

Pests and diseases
No information

Cultivation
There are no known cultivars of this taxon, nor is it known to be in commerce.

Accessions

Australasia
Mount Lofty Botanic Garden, Piccadilly, Australia. One tree, raised from seed sent by the Beijing Botanical Garden, planted out c. 1984, 4.5 m high, d.b.h. 13 cm in 2008.

References

glaucescens var. lasiocarpa
Trees of China
Flora of China
Trees of Asia
Ulmus articles missing images
Elm species and varieties